Høiåsmasten is a TV tower used for DAB-, GSM-, FM- and TV-transmission near Halden, Norway.  Høiåsmasten, built in 1973, is one of the tallest partially guyed towers in the world and with a height of  the second tallest tower of Norway.  It consists, like the Gerbrandy Tower and Vännäs TV Tower, of a concrete tower as basement on which the guyed antenna mast is mounted. However this mast is, in contrast to that of Gerbrandy Tower, a lattice structure and not a tube structure.

External links 
 http://rune-feldt.se/allman/mast/

See also 
 List of masts
 List of towers
 List of tallest structures in Norway

Towers in Norway
Buildings and structures in Halden
1980 establishments in Norway
Transmitter sites in Norway
Norkring